Dermacentor is a genus of ticks in the family Ixodidae, the hard ticks. The genus has a cosmopolitan distribution, with native species on all continents except Australia. Most occur in the Nearctic realm.

Hosts of Dermacentor ticks include many large and small mammals, including horses, deer, cattle, lagomorphs, peccaries, porcupines, tapirs, desert bighorn sheep, and humans. The American dog tick (D. variabilis) is a member of the genus.

Dermacentor species are vectors of many pathogens, including Rickettsia rickettsii, which causes the disease Rocky Mountain spotted fever, Coxiella burnetii, which causes Q fever, Anaplasma marginale, which causes anaplasmosis in cattle, Francisella tularensis, which causes tularemia, Babesia caballi, which causes equine piroplasmosis, and the Flavivirus that causes Powassan encephalitis. Dermacentor ticks inject a neurotoxin that causes tick paralysis.

Species

As of 2019, about 41 species are placed in the genus:
Dermacentor abaensis Teng, 1963
Dermacentor albipictus Packard, 1869 – winter tick
Dermacentor andersoni Stiles, 1908 – Rocky Mountain wood tick
Dermacentor asper Arthur, 1960
Dermacentor atrosignatus Neumann, 1906
Dermacentor auratus Supino, 1897
Dermacentor bellulus Schulze, 1933
Dermacentor circumguttatus Neumann, 1897
Dermacentor compactus Neumann, 1901
Dermacentor confragus Schulze, 1933
Dermacentor dispar Cooley, 1937
Dermacentor dissimilis Cooley, 1947
Dermacentor everestianus Hirst, 1926
Dermacentor filippovae Apanaskevich & Apanaskevich, 2015
Dermacentor halli McIntosh, 1931
Dermacentor hunteri Bishopp, 1912
Dermacentor imitans Warburton 1933
Dermacentor kamshadalus Neumann, 1908
Dermacentor laothaiensis Apanaskevich et al., 2019
Dermacentor latus Cooley, 1937
Dermacentor limbooliati Apanaskevich & Apanaskevich, 2015
Dermacentor marginatus Sulzer, 1776
Dermacentor montanus Filippova & Panova, 1974
Dermacentor nitens Neumann, 1897
Dermacentor niveus Neumann 1897
Dermacentor nuttalli Olenev, 1928
Dermacentor occidentalis Marx, 1892 - Pacific Coast tick
Dermacentor panamensis Apanaskevich & Bermúdez, 2013
Dermacentor parumapertus Neumann, 1901
Dermacentor pasteuri Apanaskevich et al., 2020
Dermacentor pavlovskyi Olenev 1927
Dermacentor pomerantzevi Serdyukova, 1951
Dermacentor pseudocompactus Apanaskevich & Apanaskevich, 2016
Dermacentor raskemensis Pomerantsev, 1946
Dermacentor reticulatus Fabricius, 1794 – ornate cow tick, ornate dog tick, meadow tick, marsh tick
Dermacentor rhinocerinus Denny, 1843
Dermacentor silvarum Olenev 1931
Dermacentor sinicus Schulze, 1932
Dermacentor steini Schulze, 1933
Dermacentor taiwanensis Sugimoto, 1935
Dermacentor tamokensis Apanaskevich & Apanaskevich, 2016
Dermacentor ushakovae Filippova & Panova 1987
Dermacentor variabilis Say, 1821 – wood tick, American dog tick

References

External links

Ticks
Acari genera
Parasitic arthropods of mammals
Ixodidae